Maccabi Be'er Ya'akov was an Israeli football club based in Be'er Ya'akov.

History
The club was founded in 2005 after the previous club of the town, Hapoel Be'er Ya'akov, which have played in the past in Liga Alef, was dissolved. In their first season of existence, Maccabi were promoted to Liga Bet, after they finished runners-up in Liga Gimel Central-South division.

Their second season of existence, which was their first in Liga Bet, was successful, as they finished the 2006–07 season in third place in Liga Bet South B division. However, in the 2009–10 season, the club finished third bottom and relegated to Liga Gimel after they lost in the decisive relegation play-off match against Beitar Giv'at Ze'ev. In the following season, the club made an immediate return to Liga Bet, after they won Liga Gimel Central division. in their comeback season In Liga Bet, they equaled their best achievement with another third-place finish and in the following season, they made history by winning Liga Bet South B division, and promoted to Liga Alef for the first time in their history.

During their 2013–14 season in Liga Alef South, the club have entered administration, and as a result, were deducted nine points. The club finished second bottom and relegated back to Liga Bet at the end of the season.

After major financial problems, the club dissolved in August 2014 and did not enter Liga Bet for the 2014–15 season.

Honours
Liga Bet South B:
2012–13
Liga Gimel Central:
2010–11

External links
Maccabi Be'er Ya'akov Yossi The Israel Football Association

References

Be'er Ya'akov
Be'er Ya'akov
Association football clubs established in 2005
2005 establishments in Israel
Association football clubs disestablished in 2014
2014 disestablishments in Israel